Malijan may refer to:
 Malijan-e Bala
 Malijan-e Pain